Andries Johannes (André) de Kruijff (9 April 1895 – 29 November 1964) was a Dutch footballer. He played in one match for the Netherlands national football team in 1921.

Personal life
André was born in Amsterdam, the son of Dirk Willem de Kruijff and Francisca Henriëtta Maria Borghols. He was married to Johanna Geertruida Smit and had two children.

Career statistics

Sources

References

External links
 

1895 births
1964 deaths
Dutch footballers
Footballers from Amsterdam
Association football midfielders
AFC Ajax players
Netherlands international footballers